The Sumgayit 2013–14 season was Sumgayit's third Azerbaijan Premier League season. They finished 9th in the Premier League and they reached the Second Round of the Azerbaijan Cup where they were beaten by FK Baku. It is Agil Mammadov's first full season as manager.

Squad

Transfers

Summer

In:

  

 

 

 
 
 

Out:

Winter

In:

 
 

 

 

Out:

Friendlies

Competitions

Azerbaijan Premier League

Results summary

Results by round

Results

League table

Azerbaijan Cup

Squad statistics

Appearances and goals

|-
|colspan="14"|Players who appeared for Sumgayit no longer at the club:

|}

Goal scorers

Disciplinary record

References
Qarabağ have played their home games at the Tofiq Bahramov Stadium since 1993 due to the ongoing situation in Quzanlı.

External links 
Soccerway

Sumgayit FK seasons
Sumgayit